The Rural Municipality of Biggar No. 347 is a rural municipality (RM) in the Canadian province of Saskatchewan within Census Division No. 12 and  Division No. 6.

History 
The RM of Biggar No. 347 incorporated as a rural municipality on December 11, 1911.

Geography

Communities and localities 
The following urban municipalities are surrounded by the RM.

Towns
 Biggar

The following unincorporated communities are within the RM.

Special service areas
 Springwater (dissolved as a village December 31, 2006)

Localities
 Argo
 Castlewood
 Cazalet
 Duperow
 Monarchvale
 Naseby
 Neola
 Oban
 Vance

Biggar & District Regional Park 
Biggar & District Regional Park is a small regional park located about one kilometre north of Biggar on Highway 4. The park has an 11-site campground and an open area for group camping with two cook shacks. Just north of the campground is the 9-hole, grass green golf course. Each hole has two spots to tee off from.

Demographics 

Government 
The RM of Biggar No. 347 is governed by an elected municipal council and an appointed administrator that meets on the third Tuesday of every month. The reeve of the RM is Jeanne Marie de Moissac while its administrator is Sandi Silvernagle. The RM's office is located in Biggar.

See also 
List of rural municipalities in Saskatchewan

References 

B